Giandari is a mountain peak, approximately  in height, in the Sulaiman Mountains range in Pakistan. It is located in the Mazari Tribal Territory of Rojhan Mazari, on the Balochistan Province—Punjab Province border .

Giandari is a part of the large and extensive Sulaiman Range of mountains and hills. Rojhan Mazari is the closest town, near the Indus River.

See also
 List of mountains in Pakistan
 Geography of Balochistan, Pakistan

Sulaiman Mountains
Mountains of Balochistan (Pakistan)
Mountains of Punjab (Pakistan)